Here is an adverb that means "in, on, or at this place". It may also refer to:

Software
 Here Technologies, a mapping company
 Here WeGo (formerly Here Maps), a mobile app and map website by Here

Television
 Here TV (formerly "here!"), a TV network
 "Here" (2019), first episode of Green Eggs and Ham (TV series)

Music
 Here (Adrian Belew album), 1994
 Here (Alicia Keys album), 2016
 Here (Cal Tjader album), 1979
 Here (Edward Sharpe album), 2012
 Here (Idina Menzel album), 2004
 Here (Merzbow album), 2008
 Here (Nicolay album), 2006
 Here (Leo Sayer album), 1979
 Here (Teenage Fanclub album), 2016
 "Here" (Alessia Cara song), 2015
 "Here" (The Grace song), 2008
 "Here" (Rascal Flatts song), 2008
 "Here" (1954 song), song with music by Harold Grant and lyrics by Dorcas Cochran
 "Here (In Your Arms)", 2006 song by Hellogoodbye
 "Here", a 1971 song by America from their eponymous debut album
 "Here", a 2014 song by Christine and the Queens from Chaleur humaine
 "Here", a 2018 song by David Byrne from American Utopia
 "Here", a 1992 song by Pavement from Slanted and Enchanted

Films
 Here (2003 film) (Tu), a 2003 Croatian film directed by Zrinko Ogresta
 Here (2009 film), a 2009 Singaporean film directed by Tzu Nyen Ho
 Here (2011 film), a 2011 American drama directed by Braden King

Food
 Here (grape), another name for the French wine grape Fer
 Gros Verdot, another French wine grape that is also known as Hère
 Béquignol noir, another French wine grape that is also known as Here's

Other
 Here, an Old English name for  an invading army or raiding party containing more than thirty-five men
 Here (comics), published in the magazine RAW
 "Here", a poem by Philip Larkin
 Here (play), by Michael Frayn
 Here, Prozor, a village in Bosnia and Herzegovina
 HERE Arts Center, New York City off-off-Broadway organization
 Hotel Employees and Restaurant Employees Union, a US labor union representing workers of the hospitality industry

See also
 Deixis
 Hear (disambiguation)
 Hera, a Greek goddess whose name is sometimes spelled Hērē
 Here document
 Here and Now (disambiguation)
 Metaphysics of presence